Crespo is a city in the Argentine province of Entre Ríos, some 40 km from the provincial capital Paraná. It has around 19,500 inhabitants (as per the ), most of whom are descendants of Volga Germans who migrated from Russia to Argentina from 1875 onwards. The town's German heritage is reflected in the annual beer festival, based on the Oktoberfest but held in January. The economy is centered in avicultural and other agricultural products.

Successful footballer Gabriel Heinze (formerly of A.S. Roma, Manchester United, Olympique de Marseille and Real Madrid) was born in Crespo.

References

 
 Turismo Entre Ríos — Touristic portal of the province.

Populated places in Entre Ríos Province
Volga German diaspora
Cities in Argentina
Argentina
Entre Ríos Province